Elite Warriors: Vietnam is a 2005 squad-based first-person/third-person hybrid shooter video game developed by American studio nFusion and published by Bold Games for Microsoft Windows.

The game simulates the "Black Ops" special operations of the classified MACV-SOG formations during Vietnam War. It was developed in cooperation with MACV-SOG veteran John L. Plaster.

Reception

Elite Warriors: Vietnam received "generally unfavorable reviews" according to the review aggregation website Metacritic.

Erik Wolpaw of GameSpot criticized the game's lack of variety in its level design and gameplay. Jason D'Aprile of X-Play praised the game for its authenticity and sound design but criticized it for its mediocre graphics, AI, and level design. Michael Lafferty of GameZone was slightly more positive in his reception of the game, praising its environmental design but criticizing for technical issue.

References

External links 
Official website (nFusion)
Official website (Bold Games)

2005 video games
Tactical shooter video games
Vietnam War video games
Video games developed in the United States
Windows games
Windows-only games